Ricardo Caíto Risatti (born September 27, 1986, in Buenos Aires) is an Argentine racing driver who has progressed through the ranks of formula single-seater racing in South America and Europe. He was the 2006 Spanish Formula Three champion and now competes in the Argentine touring car series, TC 2000.

Career history
Risatti began his junior racing career in karting in 1998. After a relatively short period of three seasons, he progressed into formula racing in the B-class of Formula Three Sudamericana, which is based in Brazil. He entered only three races in 2001, but was one of twelve Argentinians who competed at some point in that year's championship. This was an unusually high number; the 2002 season featured only two Argentine drivers, including Risatti himself. In his first full season, Risatti was placed fourth in the B-class standings.

Risatti moved to Europe to compete in the Spanish Formula Three Championship in 2003, driving at various times for E.V. Racing and Elide Racing in ten of the thirteen races. After making annual progress with eleventh, fifth and third places in the championship, Risatti secured the 2006 title with TEC Auto.

In February 2007, Risatti was announced as a GP2 Series driver with BCN Competicion, but this position was later taken by Ho-Pin Tung. He instead competed in the World Series by Renault with GD (Great Dane) Racing. Risatti had a second chance to make his GP2 series debut when Pastor Maldonado broke his collarbone during training. Risatti competed with Trident Racing at Istanbul Park in Turkey and Monza in Italy. During this time, Luiz Razia substituted for Risatti in the World Series by Renault.  In 2008, he races in TC2000 for Chevrolet official team.

Racing record

Complete Formula Renault 3.5 Series results
(key) (Races in bold indicate pole position) (Races in italics indicate fastest lap)

Complete GP2 Series results
(key) (Races in bold indicate pole position) (Races in italics indicate fastest lap)

Complete GT1 World Championship results

Footnotes

External links
Official Site 

1986 births
Living people
Argentine racing drivers
Euroformula Open Championship drivers
Racing drivers from Buenos Aires
Formula 3 Sudamericana drivers
GP2 Series drivers
TC 2000 Championship drivers
FIA GT Championship drivers
World Series Formula V8 3.5 drivers
FIA GT1 World Championship drivers
Turismo Carretera drivers
Súper TC 2000 drivers
Trident Racing drivers
Racing Engineering drivers
De Villota Motorsport drivers
Phoenix Racing drivers